Presidential elections were held in Mali on 29 July 2018. In July 2018, the Constitutional Court approved the nomination of a total of 24 candidates in the election. As no candidate received more than 50% of the vote in the first round, a runoff was held on 12 August 2018 between the top two candidates, incumbent President Ibrahim Boubacar Keïta of the Rally for Mali and Soumaïla Cissé of the Union for the Republic and Democracy. Keïta was subsequently re-elected with 67% of the vote. It was the first time in Malian history that a presidential election was forced into a runoff between incumbent and a challenger.

Background 
In accordance with the 1992 constitution, presidential elections take place every five years. The previous elections, first scheduled for 13 May 2012, were delayed until 28 July 2013 due to the 2012 coup d'état that overthrew President Amadou Toumani Toure.

A peace deal between Tuareg separatists and the government was signed in 2015 following negotiations through a diplomatic channel extended by the Malian government. The creation of the Macina Liberation Front in 2015, led by the preacher Amadou Koufa, has led to increased ethnic tensions and violence in the country.

There has been little or no violence in Mali's past elections which have in previous years been conducted with no protests.

Electoral system
The President of Mali is elected by absolute majority vote using the two-round system to serve a 5-year term.

Pre-election
There was doubt as to the safety of the elections to be held and of the governments' ability to hold them. If held, the French diplomat Jean-Pierre Lacroix has said that "the upcoming presidential elections will mark the beginning of a new chapter in the stabilization of Mali".

Voter registration 
As of July 24, there were 8,461,000 registered voters set to cast their vote 23,041 polling stations.

Of the Malian refugees living in Mbera, Mauritania, 7,000 people registered to vote in the elections.

Candidates 

There were 17 confirmed candidates and 13 more were pending as of late June. In the end, on July 5, the Constitutional Court approved the nomination of a total of 24 candidates in the election. Some of them include:

Protests and violence 
On 6 June, thousands gathered in the capital Bamako to protest against Ibrahim Boubacar Keïta.

On 25 July, following a robbery at a pharmacy, protesters "burned tyres and torched vehicles" in Timbuktu in response to the deepening insecurity and alleged mistreatment by police. This precipitate a violent clash the following day involving about 100 people.

On 31 July, gunmen attacked a convoy carrying election materials in the Ségou Region. This attack and the following shootout killed four soldiers and eight attackers.

Results

References

Mali
President
Mali
Mali
Presidential elections in Mali